Michael Franklin Lohr (born 1952) is a retired United States Navy rear admiral who served as the 38th Judge Advocate General of the Navy from 2002 to 2004, assuming office on June 28, 2002. A career attorney, Lohr previously served as the Deputy Judge Advocate General of the Navy and Commander, Naval Legal Service Command from 2000 to 2002, with tenures as legal counsel to the Chairman of the Joint Chiefs of Staff and fleet judge advocate to the United States Second Fleet.

Lohr graduated from the University of Maryland with a B.A. degree (cum laude) in 1974, commissioning via the Navy's JAGC Student Program. Additionally, he earned his Juris Doctor degree from the University of Maryland School of Law in 1977 and a L.L.M. degree (summa cum laude) in International and Comparative Law from the George Washington University School of Law in 1984. He attended Northwestern University in 2020.

Lohr has received the Defense Superior Service Medal (with oak leaf cluster), the Legion of Merit and three Meritorious Service Medals. After retirement, Lohr was employed by Boeing in various legal capacities from 2005 to 2019.

Awards and decorations

References

1952 births
Living people
United States Navy rear admirals (upper half)
Judge Advocates General of the United States Navy
University of Maryland Francis King Carey School of Law alumni
University System of Maryland alumni
George Washington University Law School alumni
Northwestern University alumni
Recipients of the Defense Superior Service Medal
Recipients of the Legion of Merit
Legionnaires of the Legion of Merit
Recipients of the Meritorious Service Medal (United States)